Holger Kleinbub (born 28 August 1971 in Frankfurt am Main, Hesse) is a retired volleyball player from Germany, who played for the Men's National Team in the 1990s and the 2000s. Playing as a wing-spiker he earned a total number of 130 caps for the national squad.

References
  Profile

1971 births
Living people
German men's volleyball players
Sportspeople from Frankfurt